Jimmie Ireland (10 December 1903 - 25 October 1998) was a Scotland international rugby union player. He became the 64th President of the Scottish Rugby Union.

Rugby Union career

Amateur career

Ireland was born in Sauchiehall Street and went to Garnethill Primary. He then attended Glasgow High School.

He played for Glasgow HSFP.

The Jimmie Ireland stand at the Glasgow club was opened in 2000.

Provincial career

He played for Glasgow District in the 1924 inter-city match.

International career

He was capped at the age of 14 for Scotland Schools.

He received ten caps for Scotland from 1925 to 1927.

He was the last surviving member of Scotland's first Grand Slam side of 1925. In 1996, he opened a block of hospitality suites at Murrayfield Stadium each one bearing a name of that famous XV.

He swapped jerseys with Sam Tucker, the England hooker, after Scotland had beaten England at Twickenham in 1926. He was given a bill by the SRU for the loss of the Scotland jersey of 12 shillings and 6 pence.

Referee career

He was an international referee. He refereed 5 Home Nations Championship matches between 1938 and 1939.

Administrative career

He became President of Glasgow HSFP.

He was a Chairman of the International Rugby Board. As Chairman, in 1949, he saw that Australia, South Africa and New Zealand were admitted as full members for the first time.

He was President of the Scottish Rugby Union for the period 1950 to 1951.

Outside of rugby

Ireland was an accountant. An anecdote he often told at rugby dinners was the time he asked his boss for Saturday morning off as he was playing for Scotland at Murrayfield. His boss replied: 'What? The whole morning?'.

References

1903 births
1998 deaths
Scottish rugby union players
Presidents of the Scottish Rugby Union
Scotland international rugby union players
Glasgow HSFP players
Glasgow District (rugby union) players
Scottish rugby union referees
Barbarian F.C. players
Rugby union players from Glasgow